The Zine Archive & Publishing Project (ZAPP) was a zine library located in Seattle, Washington. ZAPP was a volunteer-driven living archive of over 30,000 self-published materials, independent media and zines. The mission statement of ZAPP is a DIY culture resource and educational center "committed to supporting zines from around the world, maintaining and validating publications outside the literary mainstream." ZAPP is a community around zines for the organization's volunteers. Zine Librarian, Kelly McElroy, says that "Zines are naturally good at fostering a sense of community." ZAPP closed in April 2017

History

ZAPP was founded in 1996 as a program of Hugo House and was housed in the basement until the basement flooded. ZAPP was closed to the public for one year while the volunteers mobilized to organize the move into the second floor of Hugo House and prepared a reopening party in September 2008. Since the relocation to the second floor, ZAPP has hosted exhibitions based around zines, such as "Your Zine is Alive and Well and Living in ZAPP," an exhibition that featured historically-significant zines on December 8, 2011. ZAPP is now an independent organization operating under the fiscal sponsorship of Shunpike. ZAPP separated from Hugo House to become its own organization, so the ZAPP steering committee can plan to move the collection into its own building. When ZAPP announced leaving [Hugo House], the volunteers hosted a special event at Vermillion Cafe in Seattle in May 2014. After three years of planning for its own space, Hugo House, which still owned the collection, transferred it to the Seattle Public Library, leaving ZAPP without a home or collection. In response to this decision, ZAPP closed its doors and ceased activity on April 1, 2017.

In the past, ZAPP has partnered with The Vera Project on special programs and events, like "DIY Holiday Fair."

See also

Arts centre
Alternative information centre
Anarchist bookfair
Cultural centre
Infoshop

References

External links
 

Infoshops
Non-profit organizations based in Seattle
Libraries in Seattle